Timaru District Council is the territorial authority for the Timaru District of New Zealand.

The council is led by the mayor of Timaru, who is currently . There are also nine councillors.

Composition

Councillors

 Mayor 
 Nine other councillors: Deputy Mayor Steve Wills, Allan Booth, Barbara Gilchrist, Richard Lyon, Gavin Oliver, Paddy O’Reilly, Sally Parker, Stu Piddington, Peter Burt

Community boards

 Geraldine Community Board
 Pleasant Point Community Board
 Temuka Community Board

History

The council was formed in 1989. It replaced Geraldine County Council (1904-1989) and Temuka County Council (1899-1989).

In 2020, the council had 242 staff, including 23 earning more than $100,000. According to the Taxpayers' Union think tank, residential rates averaged $2,160.

The council withdrew from Local Government New Zealand in September 2021 because it believed that body had not advocated sufficiently against the proposed Three Waters reform programme.

References

External links
 Official website

Timaru District
Politics of Canterbury, New Zealand
Territorial authorities of New Zealand